The long-tailed musk shrew (Crocidura dolichura) is a species of mammal in the family Soricidae. It is found in Burundi, Cameroon, Central African Republic, Republic of the Congo, Democratic Republic of the Congo, Gabon, Nigeria, and Uganda.

References

Crocidura
Mammals described in 1876
Taxa named by Wilhelm Peters
Taxonomy articles created by Polbot